Samuel Didier Biang (born 23 May 1974 in Koutaba) is a Cameroonian football coach and a former player. He works as a coach with the FC Krasnodar academy. He also holds Russian citizenship, and he spent the whole of his playing career in Russia. He never played on the organized level during his youth years and started playing for his university squad when he was receiving his education in computer science at the Kuban State University. Local coaches advised him to start a professional career as a football player in 1998.

References

1974 births
People from West Region (Cameroon)
Living people
Cameroonian footballers
FC Yenisey Krasnoyarsk players
Cameroonian expatriate footballers
Expatriate footballers in Russia
FC Kuban Krasnodar players
Russian Premier League players
FC Baltika Kaliningrad players
FC Slavyansk Slavyansk-na-Kubani players
Association football forwards
FC Dynamo Makhachkala players
FC Amur Blagoveshchensk players